The Tube commonly refers to:

 London Underground, a rapid transit system serving Greater London and environs
 Television

The Tube may also refer to:

 The Tube (TV series), a 1982–1987 British music programme on Channel 4
 The Tube (2003 TV series), an ITV/Sky programme featuring the work of staff on the London Underground
 The Tube (2012 TV series), a BBC documentary about those who work and travel on the London Underground
 The Tube Music Network, a 2005–2007 American music video channel
 Cardiff Bay Visitor Centre (The Tube), a demolished building in Wales, UK
 PATH (rail system), a railroad linking New Jersey and New York, US
 KTBU, formerly branded as "The Tube",  a television station licensed to Conroe, Texas, US
 "The Tube", a 1996 song by Tiësto

See also
 The Tubes, an American rock band
 Tube (disambiguation)